Ouled Yaïch is a town and commune in Blida Province, Algeria, and the capital of the Ouled Yaïch District. According to the 1998 census it has a population of 55,719.

References

Communes of Blida Province
Cities in Algeria
Algeria